Center Township is a township in Chautauqua County, Kansas, USA.  As of the 2000 census, its population was 75.

Geography
According to the USGS, it contains one cemetery, Belknap.

The stream of Bakers Branch runs through this township.

References
 USGS Geographic Names Information System (GNIS)

External links
 US-Counties.com
 City-Data.com

Townships in Chautauqua County, Kansas
Townships in Kansas